The Chinese Peasants' and Workers' Democratic Party (CPWDP) is one of the eight legally recognized political parties in the People's Republic of China under the direction of the Chinese Communist Party. The party is a member of the Chinese People's Political Consultative Conference. The current chairman is He Wei.

History

Foundation

The party had its origins in the collapse of the First United Front when they first met in November 1927.  Its original members were left-wing Nationalists and expelled Communists which called themselves the "Provisional Action Committee of the Chinese Nationalist Party" or "Third Party" (despite the name, the Young China Party was third largest in the late 1920s–40s).

After August 1930, the party became a cohesive entity under Deng Yanda, who organized it under democratic centralism like both the Nationalists and Communists.  Deng was secretly executed by Chiang Kai-shek in 1931 and the party went underground.

In 1933, the party, now led by Huang Qixiang, joined with the short-lived "Productive People's Party" in starting the failed People's Revolutionary Government of the Republic of China. In 1935, they renamed themselves in to the "Chinese Action Committee for National Liberation". It was one of the founding parties of the China Democratic League. Its leaders renamed the party in February 1947 to its current name.

Present
Currently, the Chinese Peasants' and Workers' Democratic Party comprises a membership of 144,000, most of whom work in the fields of public health, medicine, and associated fields in science and technology.

Chairpersons

Deng Yanda (1930–1931)
Huang Qixiang (1931–1938)
Zhang Bojun (1938–1958)
Ji Fang (1958–1987)
Zhou Gucheng (1987–1988)
Lu Jiaxi (1988–1997)
Jiang Zhenghua (1997–2007)
Sang Guowei (2007–2012)
Chen Zhu (2012–2022)
He Wei (2022–present)

References

External links 
  

 
1927 establishments in China
Political parties established in 1927